The Paintsville Public Library Building is a historic building located at 305 Second Street in Paintsville, Kentucky. It was constructed by the WPA in 1934. The library closed in the 1940s and was replaced by the Johnson County Public Library on February 3, 1947, which utilized the building until the 1960s. It was added to the National Register of Historic Places on January 26, 1989. It now serves as the board of education for the Paintsville Independent School District.

References

National Register of Historic Places in Johnson County, Kentucky
Neoclassical architecture in Kentucky
Library buildings completed in 1934
Libraries on the National Register of Historic Places in Kentucky
Former library buildings in the United States
1934 establishments in Kentucky
Education in Johnson County, Kentucky
Works Progress Administration in Kentucky